Mountville is the name of two towns in the United States:

Mountville, Georgia
Mountville, Pennsylvania
Mountville, South Carolina
Mountville, Virginia

See also
Montville (disambiguation)